Peter McNamee (20 March 1935 – 27 August 2021) was a Scottish professional footballer who played in the Football League for Peterborough United and Notts County as an outside left. He made nearly 350 appearances for Peterborough United and is a member of the club's Hall of Fame.

McNamee died on 27 August 2021, at the age of 86.

Career statistics

Honours 
Peterborough United
 Midland League: 1956–57, 1957–58, 1958–59, 1959–60
Football League Third Division: 1960–61
Maunsell Cup: 1956–57, 1957–58
Northamptonshire Senior Cup: 1960–61, 1961–62

Individual
 Peterborough United Hall of Fame

References

1935 births
2021 deaths
English footballers
English Football League players
Peterborough United F.C. players
Footballers from Glasgow
Association football outside forwards
King's Lynn F.C. players
Notts County F.C. players
Corby Town F.C. players
March Town United F.C. players
March Town United F.C. managers
Scottish football managers